This is a list of battery electric vehicles that are mass-produced, formerly produced, and planned. It includes only vehicles exclusively using chemical energy stored in rechargeable battery packs, with no secondary source of propulsion (e.g. hydrogen fuel cell, internal combustion engine, etc.).

Production models

Highway-capable automobiles 
Highway-capable battery electric automobiles capable of  highway speed:

Outside the Chinese market 
Production highway-capable battery electric automobiles originating outside the Chinese market, both dedicated battery electric vehicles (without an ICE-powered counterpart sharing the same body) or non-dedicated battery electric vehicles (based on an ICE-powered vehicle):

Chinese-market origin 
Current production highway-capable battery electric automobiles originating within the Chinese market, including vehicles produced by Chinese manufacturers for domestic market and export markets, and vehicles developed by foreign manufacturers that are only offered in the Chinese market:

Non-highway capable automobiles 
Battery electric automobiles not capable of  highway speed:

Former production models

Post-1995

Pre-1995

Demonstration fleets or prototypes

Vehicles planned for production

Motorcycles and scooters

Buses

 Alexander Dennis Enviro 200
 BYD C9
 BYD K9
 Higer Steed EV
 Optare Metrocity EV
 Optare Metrodecker EV
 Optare Versa EV
 Oreos 2X (PVI)
 Oreos 4X (PVI)
 eBuzz K7
 VinBus

Trucks 

 Tesla Cybertruck production to start mid-2023.
 Tesla Semi, all-electric class 8 truck: Elon Musk announced that Tesla is starting Tesla Semi production in 2022 October and that Pepsi is going to get the first electric trucks starting December.

Three-wheelers

Passenger vehicles 

Aptera Motors

 Aptera (solar electric vehicle)

Champion polyplast

 SAARTHI SHAVAK E AUTO

Mahindra Electric Mobility Limited

 Treo

Omega Seiki Mobility

 STREAM

Piaggio Vehicles Private Limited

 Ape' E-City

Cargo vehicles 

Altigreen Propulsion Labs Pvt Ltd

 NEEV
 NEEV HD
 NEEV LR

Keto Motors Private Limited

 BULKe
 BULKe plus 2.0

Kinetic Green Energy & Power Solutions Ltd

 KINETIC SAFAR STAR – 400
 KINETIC SAFAR JUMBO – PICKUP

Lohia Auto Industries

 Humsafar iBMahindra Electric Mobility Limited

 Treo Zor Treo Zor FB Treo Zor DVOmega Seiki Mobility 

 RAGE+ SUN-RI Rickshaws 

Kinetic Green Energy & Power Solutions Ltd

 KINETIC SAFAR SMART Kinetic SAFAR SMART LFPMahindra Electric Mobility Limited

 Treo Yaari HRT Treo Yaari SFTOmega Seiki Mobility

 RIDE''

See also 
 Battery electric multiple unit
 Battery electric vehicle
 Electric aircraft
 Electric boat
 Electric fire engine
 Electric motorcycles and scooters
 Electric vehicle conversion
 Plug-in electric vehicle
 Plug-in hybrid

Notes

References

External links 
 

Electric vehicles
Electric vehicles
Electric
Production electric cars